Settlers Ridge is an open-air lifestyle center in Robinson Township, Allegheny County, Pennsylvania about halfway between Penn Center West and the Robinson Town Centre. The $100 million shopping complex opened for business on October 30, 2009, with phase two of the development currently under construction as of Spring 2011. It is owned by O'Connor/Real Vest Retail Holding Co. LLC of New York, with Boston-based Wilder Companies handling management and leasing at the shopping center.

Planning and development 
In 2006, following the completion of the Ridge Road interchange off of the Parkway West (U.S. Route 22/30), developers CBL & Associates Properties, Inc. and Faison Enterprises, Inc., purchased about  nearby from Robinson Park Associates to develop a new lifestyle center, which was to be called Settlers Ridge.

The plans were put before the local planning commission in the fall of 2006, and approved by the Robinson commissioners in November 2006. An amended plan for the development was approved by the town commissioners in October 2007, and work began on the site soon after with construction on buildings beginning in the summer of 2008. In late 2010, CBL sold the first phase of the Settlers Ridge shopping complex to O'Connor/Real Vest Retail Holding Co. LLC of New York for $132.9 million, with an option to purchase the phase two addition from CBL at a later date. Boston-based Wilder Companies currently manages and leases the complex.

Anchors 
 Barnes & Noble – 
 Cinemark Theatres – 
 Giant Eagle Market District – 
 LA Fitness –

References

External links 
 

Shopping malls in Metro Pittsburgh
Shopping malls established in 2009